The SPCA 20 was a French seaplane designed for torpedo bombing. It was a low-wing monoplane of all-metal construction.

Specifications

References

Flying boats
1920s French bomber aircraft
SPCA aircraft
Low-wing aircraft
Aircraft first flown in 1928